Mfanufikile Ndzimande (born 1 April 1988) is a Swaziland international footballer who plays as a winger. As of February 2010, he plays for Mbabane Highlanders in the Swazi Premier League and has won one cap for his country.

External links

1988 births
Living people
Swazi footballers
Eswatini international footballers
Mbabane Swallows players

Association footballers not categorized by position